Roy Stewart Stadium is a 16,800-seat multi-purpose stadium in Murray, Kentucky. It opened in 1973 and is home to the Murray State University Racers football, rifle and women's track and field teams. The stadium has the second largest seating capacity of any on-campus stadium in the Ohio Valley Conference.

The seven-floor structure is named after Roy Stewart, a longtime Murray State football coach and athletics director. It features a FieldTurf surface surrounded by a nine-lane track. Inside the stadium are athletic offices, locker rooms and meeting rooms for football and track and field, as well as a training room and weight room. The Pat Spurgin Rifle Range, site of seven NCAA championships, is located at the northern end of the second floor.

The Racers' first mascot, a racehorse named Violet Cactus, is buried at the stadium near the area where the current mascot, Racer 1, begins its trek around the football field before the beginning of each football game, and after each Racer touchdown.

History
From 1934 until 1972, Racer football played at Cutchin Football Stadium, which was at the location of the current soccer field. Cutchin Stadium was demolished in 1972 when construction began on a new football stadium to be located on the North end of campus, along US Highway 641. The Racers played their first football game in Roy Stewart Stadium in 1973, and earned a win over Western Carolina University by a score of 27–25. The stadium was officially dedicated on September 9, 1974.

Renovations
On April 9, 2007, a turf replacement project began to remove the existing turf and install a FieldTurf playing surface at the stadium.  The new FieldTurf also allowed for the existing three percent grade on the field to be reduced to 0.5 percent.  The rise in the middle of the field was lowered from 18 inches to three inches.  The FieldTurf installation was completed in time for the Racers' 2007 home opener on September 15 against Lambuth University. The improvement project also brought about new play clocks, new goal posts, and a new surface on the track.

Record football crowds
All-time largest crowds
16,600, vs. Eastern Kentucky, October 31, 1981 (L 20–24)
16,300, vs. Middle Tennessee State, October 18, 1980 (W 38–6)
16,300, vs. Tennessee Tech, September 26, 1981 (W 15–10)
16,000, vs. Eastern Kentucky, October 27, 1979 (W 24–7)
15,800, vs. Western Kentucky, November 22, 1980 (W 49–0)
15,711, vs. Eastern Kentucky, November 4, 1995 (W 17–7)
15,500, vs. Youngstown State, September 13, 1980 (W 24–6)
15,200, vs. Eastern Kentucky, October 29, 1977 (W 24–20)
15,200, vs. Western Kentucky, November 23, 1974 (W 9–7)
15,000, vs. Southeast Missouri State, September 6, 1980 (W 19–6)

Largest crowds since 2000
11,921, vs. Morehead State, September 21, 2019 (W 59-7)
11,276, vs. Tennessee Tech, October 28, 2000 (L 21–36)
11,137, vs. UT Martin, September 29, 2018 (W 45–38)
10,897, vs. Jacksonville State, September 27, 2014 (L 28-52)
10,620, vs. Tennessee Tech, September 26, 2015 (L 29–31)
10,132, vs. Missouri State, September 14, 2013 (W 41–38)
10,031, vs. Tennessee State, September 17, 2011 (W 58–27)
10,014, vs. Southeast Missouri State, September 24, 2016 (L 16–17)
9,848, vs. #25 Central Arkansas, September 8, 2012 (L 20–42)
9,794, vs. Tennessee Tech, September 29, 2012 (W 70–35)
9,597, vs. UT Martin, October 13, 2012 (L 59–66)
9,191, vs. Austin Peay, September 23, 2017 (L 7–27)
9,019, vs. Austin Peay, October 10, 2015 (W 34–18)

See also
List of NCAA Division I FCS football stadiums

References

External links
Murray State University – Roy Stewart Stadium

College football venues
Murray State Racers football
American football venues in Kentucky
Multi-purpose stadiums in the United States
Buildings and structures in Calloway County, Kentucky
1973 establishments in Kentucky
Sports venues completed in 1973
College track and field venues in the United States
Athletics (track and field) venues in Kentucky